The 1st Field Artillery Regiment or 1A was an artillery battalion in the Land Component of the Belgian Armed Forces. The regiment was the field artillery battalion of the 7th Brigade until 2010.

The unit was stationed in Bastogne and was equipped with the M109 self-propelled howitzer of 105mm and later the Mortier 12O RT heavy mortar.

History

The 1st Field Artillery Regiment was established on 21 February 1836, when the Regiment of Artillery was split up into three new regiments. The regiment participated in both World Wars. During the Second World War, it remained active after the Eighteen Days' Campaign, the campaign of the Belgian army in May 1940 when Belgium was invaded by Germany. The First Belgian Battery, which was created in the United Kingdom in February 1941, participated as part of the Brigade Piron in the Battle of Normandy and in fights in Belgian and Dutch Limburg during the liberation of Western Europe. For this reason, the regiment's first battery, A Battery, is known as Batterie Libération (French for "Liberation Battery").

Alliances
 - 1er Régiment d'Artillerie de Marine (1er RAMa)

References

External links
Section of the website of the Belgian Ministry of Defence about the 1st Field Artillery Regiment - Only available in French and Dutch

Military units and formations established in 1836
Field Artillery, 1
1836 establishments in Belgium
2010 disestablishments in Belgium
Military units and formations disestablished in 2010